Cox's Road may refer to:

 Cox's Road, Hong Kong
 Cox's Road (New South Wales), Australia

See also
 Cox (disambiguation)